Lewis Alan Bridger (born 4 November 1989, in Hastings, Sussex) is a motorcycle speedway rider from England.

Career
Bridger stepped straight into Elite League racing from the Conference League after one season with the Weymouth Wildcats. His career includes spells with Eastbourne Eagles and Lakeside Hammers, who he re-signed for in February 2016.

On 21 September 2007, Bridger was selected to represent Great Britain at the 2007 Under 21-World Cup Final. In 2006, he became British Under 18 Champion and in 2009 he won the British Under 21 Championship.

On 20 November 2009, Bridger signed for Peterborough Panthers from his home town club Eastbourne Eagles. He returned to the Eagles for the 2011 and 2012 seasons before moving on to Lakeside Hammers in 2013. After two seasons with the Hammers he announced that would not ride in 2015, stating "I have lost my love for the sport, have no desire to race and am quite simply not enjoying it any more." He changed his mind and signed for Coventry Bees at the start of the 2015 season but left before riding for the club after the management refused to meet his demands to fund equipment. He signed for Leicester Lions in May to replace Mikkel Michelsen who had quit British speedway, but quit again after only one meeting, informing the promotion only a few hours before their home meeting against Poole Pirates on 25 May.

As of 2021, he rides in the top tier of British Speedway, riding for the King's Lynn Stars in the SGB Premiership 2021.

Career details

World Championships 

 U-21 World Individual Championship
 2007 –  Ostrów Wlkp. - 10th place (6 pts)
 2008 –  Pardubice - 10th place (6 pts)
 2009 -  Goričan - 9th place (7 pts)
 Team U-21 World Championship (U-21 Speedway World Cup)
 2007 –  Abensberg - Silver medal (11 pts)
 2008 – 3rd place in Qualifying Round 1 (9 pts)
 2009 – 4th place in Qualifying Round 1 (6 pts)

References 

1989 births
Living people
British speedway riders
Eastbourne Eagles riders
Peterborough Panthers riders
Lakeside Hammers riders
Leicester Lions riders
Weymouth Wildcats riders
Coventry Bees riders
Berwick Bandits riders
King's Lynn Stars riders
Sportspeople from Hastings